The Mindjim languages are a small family of closely related languages spoken in the Mindjim River area of Papua New Guinea. They were linked with the Rai Coast languages in 1951 by Arthur Capell in his Madang family, but separated out again by Timothy Usher.

Languages
The languages are, 
Anjam (Bom)
Bongu
Male
Sam (Songum)

References

 
Languages of Papua New Guinea
Central Madang languages